Into Night's Requiem Infernal is the seventh studio album by the American death-doom band Novembers Doom. It was released on July 7, 2009 through The End Records. The album was recorded at Belle City Sound studio in Racine, Wisconsin with bassist Chris Djuricic producing and Dan Swanö mixing at Unisound in Örebro, Sweden.

Track listing

Personnel
 Paul Kuhr - vocals
 Chris Wisco - bass, producer, engineering, editing
 Sasha Horn - drums
 Larry Roberts - guitars
 Vito Marchese - guitars

Additional personnel and staff
 Thomas A.G. Jensen - vocals on "When Desperation Fills the Void"
 Wiley Wells - keyboards
 Tommy Guest - design, illustration
 Dan Swanö - mixing, mastering
 Raymond Bovkin - band photography

References 

2009 albums
Novembers Doom albums
The End Records albums